The South African Railways Class 32-200 of 1966 was a diesel-electric locomotive.

In June and July 1966, the South African Railways placed ten  General Electric type U20C1 diesel-electric locomotives with a 1Co+Co1 wheel arrangement in service in South West Africa.

Manufacturer
The Class 32-200 type GE U20C1 diesel-electric locomotive was designed and built to South African Railways (SAR) requirements by General Electric (GE) and imported.

Class 32 series
The Class 32 consisted of two series, the high short hood Class  and the low short hood Class , both GE products and both with a 1Co+Co1 wheel arrangement. Both had single station controls.

Both versions ran on the same 1Co' bogies, three-axle Co' bogies with additional integral single axle pony trucks which was designed and produced by General Steel Castings. The fourth axle reduced the maximum axle loading sufficiently to enable these relatively heavy locomotives to operate on the very light rail which was used throughout South West Africa at the time.

The Class 32-200 was a more powerful low short hood version of the earlier Class  and was essentially a Class  locomotive on the bogies of the Class . Apart from the bogies which necessitated a smaller fuel tank, its physical dimensions and exterior appearance were identical to that of the Class  and it used the same V12 prime mover.

Service

South African Railways
While it was acquired specifically for service on light rail in South West Africa, the Class 32-200s also ended up being employed in South Africa at times. From 1972 to 1974, between the withdrawal of the Class GO  Garratt locomotives and the arrival of the Class  diesel-electrics on the line between Amabele and Umtata in Transkei, some of them performed temporary service on that line.

Post-SAR service
All ten locomotives survived and most were still in service by 2014.
 No.  works at the Pretoria Portland Cement lime plant in Saldanha.
 No.  works between the New Clydesdale Colliery near Witbank and the Transnet Freight Rail sidings at Bezuidenhoutsrust.

Liveries
The class 32-000 were delivered in the new Gulf Red livery with yellow side-stripes on the long hood and a yellow V on each end. They wore this livery throughout their SAR service life.

Works numbers
The Class 32-200 builder's works numbers and disposition are listed in the table.

Illustration

References

3310
1-C+C-1 locomotives
(1′Co)+(Co1′) locomotives
1Co+Co1 locomotives
General Electric locomotives
Cape gauge railway locomotives
Railway locomotives introduced in 1966
1966 in South Africa